Estadio Fiscal de Talca is a multi-use public stadium in Talca, Chile.  It is currently used mostly for association football matches and is the home stadium of Rangers. 

The stadium was built in 1930 as "Estadio Municipal de Talca". after seven years, in 1937, it would pass into the hands of the State and began to be called "Estadio Fiscal", with an original capacity of 17,000. In 2011 it was completely renovated, and currently holds 8,200 people (all seated).

In July 2017, the Government of Chile announced that the stadium will expand its seating capacity to 16,000 by building the North and South ends. The expansion will cost CLP $6,811,716,000 (USD $11,352,860) and is set to be completed in September 2018.

References

Fiscal
Sports venues in Maule Region
Rangers de Talca